Sean Kuraly (born January 20, 1993) is an American professional ice hockey forward currently playing for the Columbus Blue Jackets of the National Hockey League (NHL). He was selected by the San Jose Sharks in the fifth round, 133rd overall, in the 2011 NHL Entry Draft.

Playing career
As a youth, Kuraly played in the 2005 and 2006 Quebec International Pee-Wee Hockey Tournaments with minor ice hockey teams from Ohio. After early years with the Tier 1 Ohio AAA Blue Jackets, Kuraly played four games in the U.S. National Development Team Program before joining the Indiana Ice of the United States Hockey League (USHL). After his first full rookie season with the Ice, Kuraly was selected by the San Jose Sharks in the fifth round, 133rd overall, of the 2011 NHL Entry Draft. During the 2011–12 season, Kuraly was fourth in the league with 70 points and 32 goals in 54 regular-season games. This earned him Second-Team All-USHL honors.

After completing his USHL junior career with the Ice, Kuraly embarked on a collegiate career, in joining Miami University in Ohio.

Collegiate
In his freshman year playing for the Miami RedHawks ice hockey team, Kuraly played in 40 games and earned 12 points. He missed two games due to the 2013 World Junior Ice Hockey Championships. He helped guide the RedHawks to the 2013 CCHA Men's Ice Hockey Tournament, where he scored the game-winning goal to defeat Michigan State University in the quarterfinals. The RedHawks later lost to the University of Michigan in the semifinals. The following season, Kuraly played in 38 games and ended with a new career-high 29 points.

Upon completing his junior season with the RedHawks in 2014–15 season, Kuraly's NHL rights were traded by the Sharks (along with a first-round pick) to the Boston Bruins in exchange for goaltender Martin Jones on July 1, 2015.

In the 2015–16 season, Kuraly was unable to match the production of his previous two seasons, contributing with 6 goals and 23 points in his senior and final collegiate season. Despite this, he was named NCHC Defensive Forward of the Year and a member of the NCHC Academic All-Conference Team due to his 3.13 GPA. On June 30, 2016, Kuraly signed his first professional contract, agreeing to a two-year, entry-level deal with the Boston Bruins.

Professional
After attending the Bruins' training camp, he was reassigned to make his professional debut in the 2016–17 season, with Boston's American Hockey League (AHL) affiliate, the Providence Bruins. On November 1, 2016, he received his first NHL recall on an emergency basis with the Bruins. He made his NHL debut with the Bruins, skating on the fourth-line in a 4–3 shootout victory over the Tampa Bay Lightning on November 3, 2016.

Kuraly scored his first two career goals, including the double overtime winner, in a 3–2 win in Game 5 of the 2017 Eastern Conference Quarterfinals against the Ottawa Senators. This would be followed early in the 2017–18 season with his first-ever regular season Bruins goal, the winner in a 2–1 home ice defeat of the Vegas Golden Knights on November 2, 2017.

Following the  season, his fifth with the Boston Bruins, Kuraly left the organization as a free agent and was signed to a four-year, 10 million contract with hometown club, the Columbus Blue Jackets, on July 28, 2021.

Personal life
Kuraly's father Rick also played hockey at Miami University (OH); he is the RedHawks all-time leading goal-scorer and ranks third in career points, and was also inducted into the Miami Athletic Hall of Fame in 2014.

Career statistics

Regular season and playoffs

International

Awards and honors

References

External links
 

1993 births
American men's ice hockey centers
Boston Bruins players
Columbus Blue Jackets players
Indiana Ice players
Living people
Miami RedHawks men's ice hockey players
People from Dublin, Ohio
Providence Bruins players
Ice hockey players from Ohio
San Jose Sharks draft picks